Juan José Ulloa Solares  (September 27, 1827 – June 23, 1888) was a Costa Rican politician.

He graduated with a Bachelor of Philosophy from the University of Santo Tomás in 1845 and a Bachelor of Laws from the University of San Carlos de Guatemala in 1853.

Vice presidents of Costa Rica
1827 births
1888 deaths
Supreme Court of Justice of Costa Rica judges